The 2018–19 Toulouse FC season was the 48th professional season of the club since its creation in 1970.

Players

Out on loan

Competitions

Ligue 1

League table

Results summary

Results by round

Matches

Coupe de France

Coupe de la Ligue

References

Toulouse FC seasons
Toulouse FC